KKOB-FM (96.3 MHz) is a commercial radio station in Albuquerque, New Mexico. It is owned by Cumulus Media and it simulcasts a news/talk radio format with co-owned KKOB.  The studios and offices are on 4th Street NW in downtown Albuquerque.  KKOB-AM-FM use the FM station's dial position for the moniker "96.3 News Radio KKOB."

KKOB-FM has an effective radiated power (ERP) of 20,000 watts.  The transmitter is on Sandia Crest, amid many FM and TV towers.

Programming
KKOB-AM-FM provide local news and weather updates around the clock, traffic "on the 7's" and national news updates from ABC News Radio.  On weekdays, the schedule features mostly local talk shows including Bob Clark in morning drive time, Darren White middays, TJ Trout afternoons and Brandon Vogt in the evening.  The rest of the schedule is nationally syndicated talk radio hosts Dan Bongino, Mark Levin, "Red Eye Radio" and "America in The Morning."

Weekends includes shows on money, health, home repair, gardening and technology, some of which are paid brokered programming.  Syndicated shows on weekends include Jim Bohannon, Chris Plante, Ric Edelman and Bill Cunningham.

History

Classical KHFM
96.3 launched in November 1954 as the second FM and first commercial FM station in Albuquerque. It was the longtime home of classical music station KHFM for over 46 years. Citadel Broadcasting acquired KHFM and sister station KHFN (1050 AM) for $5.75 million in March 1996.

In March 2001, Citadel made an agreement with American General Media to move the classical format to its current home on 95.5 FM, while Citadel would continue to handle advertising for the station. That agreement ended in 2005, with control of KHFM taken over by American General Media.  (In 2017, as part of a deal where American General bought Univision's entire Albuquerque cluster, KHFM was spun off to KHFM Community Partners, operated as a listener-supported station.)

Classic Rock and Hot Talk KBZU 
In early April 2001, 96.3 became a classic rock station branded as "The Buzzard", with the call sign changing to KBZU. "The Buzzard" challenged area rock radio rivals KIOT and KZRR, and used a slogan claiming to play "Real Classic Rock," featuring a mix that was somewhat harder than most classic rock stations at the time by avoiding songs that had crossed over onto the Top 40 charts.  It played only classic bands and no modern rock that it dubbed as "weird." That format also included the syndicated Bob & Tom Show in the morning, and in late 2006, it added Opie and Anthony in the afternoon. Nights with Alice Cooper also aired on "The Buzzard" at night in the last couple of years. Some local personalities had also been featured as well throughout its run. Over the years, however, the station consistently lagged behind its competitors in the Arbitron ratings.

The station aired a Hot Talk format, titled "96.3 The Buzz", from February 12, 2007 until August 2, 2008. The talk format featured Bob & Tom in morning and Opie and Anthony in the afternoon, along with Dennis Miller, Mike O'Meara (before that, Don & Mike), and Tom Leykis. The station also featured locally produced programs, including the morning "zu", featuring "Chad" and "The Weezle". Citadel Broadcasting also divested KBZU to Last Bastion Station Trust on June 12, 2007, but it was reclaimed by the now-Cumulus Media effective April 30, 2013.

KBZU aired a Spanish language sports talk format broadcasting the national ESPN Deportes Radio network from August 2, 2008 until May 15, 2009. This format generated no Arbitron ratings at all during its nine-month run.

On May 22, 2009, KBZU returned to a classic rock music format branded as "96.3 The Mountain" with the slogan "Duke City's Classic Rock". All music and disc jockeys came from a satellite feed of The Classic Rock Experience, which was provided by Citadel Media (now Cumulus Media). There was no local content, excluding commercials.

Nash Icon

On August 15, 2014, at 5 p.m., KBZU became one of the first affiliates of the new "Nash Icons" network as 96.3 Nash Icon. KBZU was one of thirteen stations Cumulus had flipped to the new format.

"96.3 Nash Icon" aired country music, mostly from the 80s, 90s and early 2000s. The station shared the "Nash" brand with current-based country sister station KRST until it dropped the "Nash" brand in June 2019. "Nash Icon" was developed by Cumulus Media, used on numerous Cumulus stations across the country as well as some non-Cumulus stations. Described as a "Hot AC for Country", the format focuses on popular country hits from the mid-1980s to early 2000s from the biggest artists of that time (the "Icons") such as Garth Brooks, Reba McEntire, George Strait, Shania Twain and Alan Jackson along with some new material to be released on the new "Nash Icon" record label. Nash Icon plays about 25-40% new material, without some current trends such as "Bro-country" heard on current based country stations.

In April 2015, Tony Lynn, who had been a long time morning host at KRST in the 1990s and KBQI from 2000-2011, returned to the air on KBZU in the afternoon. Other personalities included Kris Abrams in mornings, Paul Bailey in middays and Johnboy Crenshaw during nights.

News/Talk KKOB-FM
The call letters KKOB-FM had long been assigned to co-owned 93.3, which has a Top 40/CHR format that was branded as "KOB-FM" for many years. On November 15, 2019, that station rebranded as "93.3 The Q" and changed call letters to KOBQ. Initially, it was believed that this was done to avoid confusion with KKOB, which had broadcast on translator K233CG (94.5 FM) since September 2016. However, the KKOB-FM call letters were in fact being reassigned to 96.3 to simulcast the heritage news and talk format from KKOB.

The simulcast began at 9:00 a.m. on January 6, 2020, along with the change in call letters to KKOB-FM.  The simulcast reflects a trend with young-to-middle aged listeners avoiding the AM band, even for a radio station they might like if heard on FM.

References

External links

KOB-FM
Radio stations established in 1954
1954 establishments in New Mexico
Cumulus Media radio stations